Sherman Building can refer to:
(sorted by state)

 Sherman Building (Sullivan, Indiana), listed on the National Register of Historic Places (NRHP) in Sullivan County, Indiana
 Sherman Building (Corpus Christi, Texas), listed on the NRHP in Nuences County, Texas